Thereva fulva is a Palearctic species of stiletto fly in the family Therevidae.

References

External links
Images representing  Thereva fulva 

Therevidae
Insects described in 1804